Daniel Kennedy may refer to:
Daniel Kennedy (actor), American actor
Daniel Kennedy (Manitoba judge), judge and former politician in Manitoba, Canada
Dan Kennedy (author), American author and performer
Dan Kennedy (soccer) (born 1982), American goalkeeper
Dan Kennedy (hurler, born 1925) (1925–1976), Irish hurler from County Kilkenny
Dan Kennedy (1900s hurler), Irish sportsperson who played hurling with Kilkenny
Dan Kennedy (politician), Republican member of the Montana Legislature
Danny Kennedy (politician) (born 1959), Unionist politician in Northern Ireland
Danny Kennedy (environmentalist) (born 1971), clean-technology entrepreneur and environmental activist

See also 
Daniel Kenedy (born 1974), Portuguese footballer